Vian Izak is a South African American singer-songwriter, record producer, and audio engineer. He created an animated alias to maintain his anonymity online.  Izak's artist project is part of the virtual band movement popularized by acts such as the Gorillaz and The Archies in where the members of the group are portrayed as animations.

He has worked with artists Ladysmith Black Mambazo, Keith Getty, and Kristyn Getty. He is known for his songs "The London Air Raids" and "Revolver." He also owns and operates his own independent record label called Vohnic Music LLC in Nashville. The record label is part of the Merlin Network which is the world's fourth largest music rights holder after Universal Music Group, Sony, and the Warner Music Group.

2015–2019: Early career and music
Vian is a South African immigrant who moved to the United States in 2000. His love of songwriting started out of a need to communicate as English was not his native language. He cites U2, Coldplay, and Death Cab for Cutie as early influences. As a young man he moved to Nashville and opened a recording studio on the historic Music Row. Izak brought an international sound to the Nashville music scene which made him stand out. This is exemplified in his collaborations with Grammy winning South African group Ladysmith Black Mambazo on "Brink of Love" and with Italian composer Davide Rossi on "Sangre de Cristo".

He combines his music with the illustrations of his brother to create multimedia comic stories. His first multimedia release, Northern Anthems (2018), was nominated for numerous awards including two Independent Music Awards. Music streaming platform Spotify also highlighted the release as a unique project from Nashville.

2020: Music and COVID aid
In March 2020 Vian worked with U.S. Bancorp to release a COVID-19 television advertisement using his song "Things Will Get Better" encouraging people to stay hopeful in hard times. The advertisement was played nationally in the United States. Additionally, Izak released a music video for his song "The Navigator" thanking healthcare workers for their bravery during the pandemic which received over fifty thousand views on Facebook and YouTube.

Discography

Albums
 Northern Anthems (Album, 2018)
 The Navigator (Album, 2019)
 The Navigator (Deluxe Edition) (Album, 2020)

EPs and singles
 Revolver (Single, 2016)
 Brink of Love (EP, 2016) features Ladysmith Black Mambazo and Eliza Ramgren
 Revolver Remixes (EP, 2016) single charted on Spotify's Viral Charts in Canada at #19.  
 The Astronaut (EP, 2017)
 The Astronaut Acoustic (EP, 2017)
 Will I Find My Home (Single, 2017)
 Starlit Summer's Eve (EP, 2017)
 Till Your Heart is Still (EP, 2017)
 The London Air Raids (EP, 2017) 
 Marble Floors (EP, 2017) 
 Little Lost (EP, 2017) 
 City of Love (EP, 2017)
 Starlit Summer's Eve (Noble Remix) (Single, 2018)
 Till Your Heart is Still (Parkwild Remix) (Single, 2018)
 Save My Heart (Single, 2018)
 Can you Feel My Love (Single, 2018)
 Witchcraft (Single, 2018)
 Lover's Hill (Single, 2018)
 The London Air Raids (Michael Schaewel Remix) (Single, 2019)
 Threw a Stone (Single, 2019)
 Morning Star (Single, 2019)
 Light Up (Single, 2019)
 Midnight Dance (Single, 2019)
 The Guide (feat. Dan Russo) (Single, 2019)

Live releases
 The Astronaut - Live 2017 (Single, 2018)

Production, songwriting, and engineering credits

Chart positions
{| class="wikitable"
|-
! Rank Date
! Rank
! Peak
! Song
! Platform
! Chart
! Country
|-
| June 7, 2020
| 10  
| 10
| Threw a Stone
| Apple Music
| Singer Songwriter
| Panama
|-
| March 20, 2020
| 122
| 41
| Call the Nightingale
| iTunes
| Alternative
| Italy
|-
| March 20, 2020
| 123
| 42
| As You Healed / The Guide
| iTunes
| Alternative
| Italy
|-
| March 20, 2020
| 124
| 43
| The Navigator
| iTunes
| Alternative
| Italy
|-
| July 12, 2019
| 187
| 187
| Mostly
| iTunes
| Singer Songwriter
| Canada
|-
| February 16, 2019
| 51
| 28
| Revolver
| iTunes
| Pop
| Brazil
|-
| February 16, 2019
| 91
| 75
| Revolver
| iTunes
| All Genres
| Brazil
|-
| May 14, 2018
| 19
| 14
| Revolver (I the AI Remix)
| iTunes
| Dance
| New Zealand
|-
| April 12, 2018
| 149
| 149
| Revolver
| iTunes
| Pop
| Switzerland
|-
| May 10, 2017
| 107
| 107
| Revolver
| iTunes
| Singer Songwriter
| Australia
|-
| April 29, 2017
| 47
| 47
| The Astronaut (Acoustic Version)
| Spotify
| Most Viral
| Ireland
|-
| December 16, 2016
| 36
| 36
| Revolver
| iTunes
| Singer Songwriter
| Mexico
|-

Awards

|-
| 2018 ||Vian Izak - Starlit Summer's Eve || Independent Music Award for Best AC Song || 
|-
| 2019 ||Vian Izak - Northern Anthems || Independent Music Award for Best AC Album || 
|-

References

American audio engineers
American male singer-songwriters
American people of South African descent
Record producers from Tennessee
Living people
Musicians from Nashville, Tennessee
Year of birth missing (living people)
Singer-songwriters from Tennessee